The 1902–03 Holy Cross Crusaders men's basketball team represented The College of the Holy Cross during the 1902–03 college men's basketball season. The head coach was Fred Powers, coaching the crusaders in his second season.

Schedule

|-

References

Holy Cross Crusaders men's basketball seasons
Holy Cross